Garegin Nzhdeh Square is a Yerevan Metro station. It was opened to the public on 4 January 1987 and located on Garegin Nzhdeh Square. Formerly known by the name Spandaryan Square, it was renamed as a tribute to the Armenian independence hero, Garegin Nzhdeh.

Gallery

References

Yerevan Metro stations
Railway stations opened in 1987
1987 establishments in the Soviet Union